Nivel 3 is the third album released by Mexican rock band, Coda. It was released in 1997.

Track listing
 "No Digas No" - 3:20 
 "Luz Roja" - 3:42 
 "Por Tí" - 3:47 
 "Prohibido" - 4:09 
 "En La Marea Del Pecado" - 4:18 
 "Perdóname" - 4:23 
 "Carrusel" - 3:34 
 "Muy Bien" - 4:10 
 "No Te Quiero Perder" - 5:00 
 "Halcón De Invierno" - 4:54 
 "¿Que Color Se Necesita?" - 5:27

Personnel
 Salvador Aguilar - lead vocals
 Toño Ruiz - guitars
 Chucho Esquivel - drums
 Allan Pérez - bass
 David Melchor - keyboards

Notes

References
Album Info at Heavy Harmonies.

1997 albums
Coda (band) albums